The 2022–23 All-Ireland Senior Club Hurling Championship was the 52nd staging of the All-Ireland Senior Club Hurling Championship, the Gaelic Athletic Association's premier inter-county club hurling tournament. The draws for the respective provincial championships took place at various stages between June and September 2022. The championship ran from 6 November 2022 to 22 January 2023.

Ballygunner of Waterford entered the championship as the defending champions, however, they were beaten by Ballyhale Shamrocks in the All-Ireland semi-final. Ferns St. Aidan's and Shinrone made their championship debuts, while Kilruane MacDonaghs and St. Finbarr's returned to the championship after long absences.

The All-Ireland final was played on 22 January 2023 at Croke Park in Dublin, between Ballyhale Shamrocks of Kilkenny andDunloy Cúchullains of Antrim, in what was their first ever championship meeting. Ballyhale Shamrocks won the match by 1-22 to 1-15 to claim their ninth All-Ireland title overall, a first title in three years and a third title in four championships. 

T. J. Reid and Pauric Mahony were the championship's joint-top scorers.

Team summaries

Leinster Senior Club Hurling Championship

Leinster quarter-finals

Leinster semi-finals

Leinster final

Munster Senior Club Hurling Championship

Munster quarter-final

Munster semi-finals

Munster final

Ulster  Senior Club Hurling Championship

Ulster semi-final

Ulster final

All-Ireland Senior Club Hurling Championship

All-Ireland semi-finals

All-Ireland final

Championship statistics

Top scorers

Overall

In a single game

References

2022 in hurling
2023 in hurling
All-Ireland Senior Club Hurling Championship